Soras is one of 11 districts of the Sucre Province in the Ayacucho region in Peru.

History
Soras district was the location of one of the largest massacres by the Shining Path terrorist group, which took place on 16 July 1982. In total, 117 people were murdered.

Population
The population of Soras (2005 census) is 1,326 people, 639 men and 687 women.

Ethnic groups 
The people in the district are mainly indigenous citizens of Quechua descent. Quechua is the language which the majority of the population (64.39%) learnt to speak in childhood, 35.18% of the residents started speaking using the Spanish language (2007 Peru Census).

Administrative division
The populated places in the district are:
 Soras
 Occoroyocc
 Cascajal
 Ccerincha
 Tranca
 Timpocc
 Chichucancha
 Ccoñani
 Pallqacha
 Putacca
 José Paccari
 Parecca
 Yacutay
 Pukawasi
 Chawpiwasi
 Doce Corral
 Rumisunto
 Quesera
 Hacienda
 Hillacha
 Cceccño
 Taccra Pata
 Allpachaka
 Soytocco
 Humasa
 Uchuy Ccoñanicha
 Yuracc Urccucha
 Ancaypahua

See also 
 Qarwarasu

References